Pyrgotis transfixa is a species of moth of the family Tortricidae. It is endemic to New Zealand. It is classified as "At Risk, Naturally Uncommon" by the Department of Conservation.

Taxonomy 
This species was first described by Edward Meyrick from a specimen collected by George Hudson at Gollan's Valley, Wellington in December. Meyrick named the species Catamacta transfixa. George Hudson described and illustrated this species under that name in his 1928 book The Butterflies and Moths of New Zealand. In 1971 John S. Dugdale placed this species within the genus Pyrgotis. The holotype specimen of this species is held at the Natural History Museum, London.

Description 
Meyrick described this species as follows:

Distribution 
This species is endemic to New Zealand. This species is only known from Wellington. Specimens have been obtained in the Ōrongorongo Valley.

Biology and life cycle 
Very little is known of the biology of this species. The adult moths are on the wing in December. They are attracted to light.

Host species and habitat 
This species prefers forest habitat. The host species and larvae of this moth are at present unknown.

Conservation status 
This species has been classified as having the "At Risk, Naturally Uncommon" conservation status under the New Zealand Threat Classification System.

References

External links 

Image of holotype specimen

Moths described in 1924
Archipini
Moths of New Zealand
Endemic fauna of New Zealand
Endangered biota of New Zealand
Endemic moths of New Zealand